The 27th government of Turkey (25 June 1962 – 25 December 1963) is the second coalition government in the history of Turkey. The prime minister, İsmet İnönü, was the leader of Republican People's Party (CHP) and a former president.

Background
After a short coalition with Justice Party (AP) in the previous government, the new coalition partners were New Turkey Party (YTP) of Ekrem Alican, Republican Villagers Nation Party (CKMP), and the Independents.
However, Osman Bölükbaşı, the leader of CKMP, pulled out of the coalition government and formed a new party named Nation Party. Even after this split, however, the government could receive the vote of confidence.

The government
Some of the cabinet members were changed during the lifespan of the cabinet. In the list below, the serving period of cabinet members who served only a part of the cabinets lifespan are shown in the column "Notes".

Aftermath
The local elections held on 17 November 1963 showed that the two smaller partners of the coalition were losing votes to the Justice Party (AP), the main opposition party. On 25 November, during İnönü's visit to the United States for the funeral of the late President John F. Kennedy, the coalition government disbanded.

References

Cabinets established in 1962
Cabinets disestablished in 1963
Cabinets of Turkey
Coalition governments of Turkey
İsmet İnönü
Members of the 27th government of Turkey
Republican People's Party (Turkey)
1962 establishments in Turkey
1963 disestablishments in Turkey
12th parliament of Turkey